Valerie J. Longhurst (born December 17, 1963) is an American politician. She is a Democratic member of the Delaware House of Representatives, where she serves as majority leader. She was elected in 2004 to represent the 15th district, which covers parts of Bear, Delaware City, and St. Georges. Longhurst began her career in the insurance industry and was formerly director of operations for AIG Insurance in Chadds Ford, Pennsylvania.

Electoral history
In 2018, Longhurst won the general election with 7,329 votes (87.9%) against Libertarian nominee Amy Merlino.

References

External links
Official page at the Delaware General Assembly

1963 births
21st-century American politicians
21st-century American women politicians
Living people
Democratic Party members of the Delaware House of Representatives
People from Kewanee, Illinois
West Chester University alumni
Women state legislators in Delaware